Hinjawadi (also incorrectly spelt Hinjewadi) is a suburb on the outskirts of Pune, India. It houses the Rajiv Gandhi Infotech Park, a large tech and business park spread over 2,800 acres, which was built by the Maharashtra Industrial Development Corporation.

History
Earlier, Hinjawadi was a village until the construction of the Rajiv Gandhi Infotech Park. Today, it is one of the epicenters of IT industry in India. To enhance the overall planning and development of Hinjawadi area, it was brought under the jurisdiction of PMRDA. Initially, the State Government was reluctant on the demands to bring the Hinjawadi under the jurisdiction of either PMC or PCMC as this area needed special attention. Currently, the Rajiv Gandhi Infotech Park is divided into three major phases with further phases planned. Eventually, the Hinjawadi Industries Association (HIA) was formed to provide a joint forum to all stakeholders based out of Hinjawadi and nearby places.

Hinjawadi is a proposed hub for integrated townships in Pimpri-Chinchwad. The new Special Township Policy Act of the Maharashtra government has laid down an integrated approach to the development of townships to de-congest Pune Municipal Corporation areas and encourage new settlements in its periphery though higher FSI (floor space index) than what is normally allowed in the municipal limits.

Transport

Road transport
Given to rapid development, Hinjawadi is prone to severe traffic congestion during the peak hours i.e. 8.00 AM to 12:00 PM and 5.30 PM to 8.00 PM. Accordingly, the HMVs (Heavy Motor Vehicles) are barred from entering Hinjawadi during these hours. The area sees a commute of roughly over 250,000 employees on a daily basis to and from the IT park.

Education
International Institute of Information Technology, Pune, Hinjawadi
Symbiosis International University, Hinjawadi
 BREI'S Blue Ridge Public School, Hinjawadi 
 Alard Group of Institutes, Hinjawadi
 Alard Public School, Hinjawadi
 Alard College of Engineering and Management, Hinjawadi
 Alard College of Pharmacy, Hinjawadi
 Alard Institute Of Management Sciences, Hinjawadi
 International Institute Of Management Studies, Nere
Mahindra International School, Hinjawadi
Blue Ridge Public School, Hinjawadi
Pawar Public School, Maan
VIBGYOR High School, Hinjawadi
The Genius English Medium High School, Hinjawadi
 Rahul International School 
Mount Litera Zee School, Hinjawadi 
SPORTSLIFE Football School, Hinjawadi

See also
Magarpatta
Kharadi
Aundh
Talawade
Shivajinagar
Kalyani Nagar
Viman Nagar

References

High-technology business districts in India
Economy of Pune
Neighbourhoods in Pimpri-Chinchwad
Software technology parks in Pune